Hanover was a two-masted brigantine packet ship owned and operated by the Falmouth Post Office Packet Service, which operated between 1688 and 1852. 

On 13 December 1763, under the command of Captain Joseph Sherbourne and en route from Lisbon to Falmouth, she was driven ashore by a gale. There were only three survivors out of 27 crew and 40 passengers. The location, near Perranporth has become known as Hanover Cove as a result. At the time she was carrying a large amount of gold and valuables; historical evidence suggests that this was mostly recovered around the time of the wrecking.

The wreck made legal history, when in 1765 an iron trunk containing bullion was recovered. The insurers had already paid out on the loss and the case established that where insurers paid out on cargo and the owners subsequently recovered their property, the insurers were entitled to a refund.

The wreck was discovered by local diver Colin Martin in 1994 following changes in the seabed and was identified by means of recovery of the ship's bell. The Post Office as owners of the wreck paid for an archaeological investigation and recommended in 1996 that it should be protected under the Protection of Wrecks Act. However, protection was not granted. It was not until 19 July 1997, that the wreck site received emergency designation following the recovery of some fifty guns and the destabilisation of the wreck by a salvage rig set up next to it. The finder was subsequently licensed to excavate under archaeological supervision with the intention of displaying finds in a local shipwreck museum.  Musket, shot, ship-fittings and the Captain's ring have also been brought to the surface. The wreck site has since been protected by return of the sand covering.The wreck is a Protected Wreck managed by Historic England.
In 2016, Cotswold Archaeology was commissioned by Historic England to use marine assessment to investigate the possible de-designation on three designated wreck sites, including the Hanover. Some doubt had been raised in earlier reports as to the definitive identification of the wreck as the Hanover, and criticism was made of the way the salvage from the wreck had been undertaken, with a failure to record finds and information in a professional manner.

See also
 Protection of Wrecks Act
 Archaeology of shipwrecks
 List of designations under the Protection of Wrecks Act

Citations

External links
 
 "Hanover" National Heritage List for England

Protected Wrecks of England
Cornish shipwrecks
1994 archaeological discoveries
Maritime incidents in 1763
1763 in England
Packet (sea transport)
Falmouth Packets